Irfan Hadžić (born 15 June 1993) is a Bosnian professional footballer who plays as a forward for Tuzla City and the Bosnia and Herzegovina national team.

Club career

Early career
Hadžić started off his football career at the youth team of Olimpik in 2010 and stayed at the club until 2011. After leaving Olimpik, he mostly played abroad at Zulte Waregem, with whom he signed his first professional contract, the youth team of Vitesse Arnhem, Inter Zaprešić, ViOn Zlaté Moravce, Royal Antwerp, who loaned him out to Vigor Wuitens Hamme, and Celje, before returning to Bosnia and Herzegovina.

Radnik Bijeljina
After six years of playing abroad, Hadžić returned to his home country and on 19 July 2017 signed a contract with Bosnian Premier League club Radnik Bijeljina. He made his official debut for Radnik in a 2–0 home league loss against Željezničar Sarajevo on 10 September 2017, coming in as a 66th minute substitute for Velibor Đurić.

He scored his first goal for the club against Sloboda Tuzla on 28 October 2017 in the 48th minute, which would turn out to be the only and the winning goal of the match.

In his second season with the club, Hadžić was Radnik's best scorer, scoring 10 goals in 32 league games in the 2018–19 season.

Zrinjski Mostar
After his contract with Radnik expired, Hadžić signed a contract with Zrinjski Mostar on 7 June 2019. He made his official debut and scored his first goal for Zrinjski on 11 July 2019, in a 3–0 away win against Akademija Pandev in the 2019–20 UEFA Europa League first qualifying round.

Hadžić made his first of only two league appearances for Zrinjski on 21 July 2019, in a 1–0 away loss against Sarajevo.

Akhisarspor
On 16 August 2019, only two months after joining Zrinjski, Hadžić left the club and signed a three-year contract with Turkish club Akhisar Belediyespor for a transfer fee of €150,000. He played his first game for Akhisarspor on 18 August 2019, a 1–0 home league win against Adanaspor, coming in as a substitute for Bertuğ Bayar in the 66th minute. Hadžić scored his first goal for Akhisarspor in a 2–1 away league loss against Osmanlıspor on 28 October 2019. He left the club on 2 January 2021.

International career
Hadžić was a member of the Bosnia and Herzegovina U19 national team from 2011 to 2012, making five appearances in the process.

On 19 August 2019, he received his first senior call-up, for UEFA Euro 2020 qualifiers against Liechtenstein and Armenia.

Hadžić made his senior international debut in a friendly game against Iran on 12 November 2020.

Career statistics

Club

International

References

External links

Irfan Hadžić at Sofascore

1993 births
Living people
People from Prozor-Rama
Bosniaks of Bosnia and Herzegovina
Association football forwards
Bosnia and Herzegovina footballers
Bosnia and Herzegovina youth international footballers
Bosnia and Herzegovina international footballers
S.V. Zulte Waregem players
NK Inter Zaprešić players
FC ViOn Zlaté Moravce players
NK Celje players
FK Radnik Bijeljina players
HŠK Zrinjski Mostar players
Akhisarspor footballers
NK Lokomotiva Zagreb players
Croatian Football League players
Slovak Super Liga players
Belgian Third Division players
Slovenian PrvaLiga players
Premier League of Bosnia and Herzegovina players
TFF First League players
Bosnia and Herzegovina expatriate footballers
Expatriate footballers in Belgium
Bosnia and Herzegovina expatriate sportspeople in Belgium
Expatriate footballers in the Netherlands
Bosnia and Herzegovina expatriate sportspeople in the Netherlands
Expatriate footballers in Croatia
Bosnia and Herzegovina expatriate sportspeople in Croatia
Expatriate footballers in Slovakia
Bosnia and Herzegovina expatriate sportspeople in Slovakia
Expatriate footballers in Slovenia
Bosnia and Herzegovina expatriate sportspeople in Slovenia
Expatriate footballers in Turkey
Bosnia and Herzegovina expatriate sportspeople in Turkey